Hárold Santiago Mosquera Caicedo (born 7 February 1995) Santi Mosquera is a Colombian professional footballer who plays as a winger for Greek Super League club OFI.

Career 
Santi Mosquera began his career with two seasons for Colombian first division side Millonarios.

In February 2018, Mosquera signed with FC Dallas of Major League Soccer. He had his contract optioned declined by Dallas following their 2020 season.

Club statistics 
 Apps (A), Goals (G), Assistance (A..)

Honours

References

External links 
 
 

1995 births
Living people
Colombian footballers
Colombian expatriate footballers
Millonarios F.C. players
FC Dallas players
C.F. Pachuca players
Deportivo Cali footballers
Expatriate soccer players in the United States
Expatriate footballers in Mexico
Categoría Primera A players
Major League Soccer players
Liga MX players
People from Buenaventura, Valle del Cauca
Colombian expatriate sportspeople in the United States
Association football wingers
Designated Players (MLS)
Sportspeople from Valle del Cauca Department
21st-century Colombian people